There are two high schools in California sharing the name Los Altos:

Los Altos High School (Hacienda Heights, California)
Los Altos High School (Los Altos, California)